Christine Herbst (born 19 July 1957 in Dresden) is a German former swimmer who competed in the 1972 Summer Olympics.

References

1957 births
Living people
German female backstroke swimmers
Olympic swimmers of East Germany
Swimmers at the 1972 Summer Olympics
Olympic silver medalists for East Germany
Swimmers from Dresden
Medalists at the 1972 Summer Olympics
Olympic silver medalists in swimming